The Crystal of Cantus is a Big Finish Productions audio drama featuring Lisa Bowerman as Bernice Summerfield, a character from the spin-off media based on the long-running British science fiction television series Doctor Who.

Plot 
Bernice, Jason and Irving Braxiatel visit the planet of Cantus to locate its fabled Crystal. There, they unearth what seems to be a tomb of Cybermen. When even that isn't what it first appears to be, Bernice discovers that she can no longer trust one of her oldest friends.

Cast
Bernice Summerfield — Lisa Bowerman
Jason Kane — Stephen Fewell
Ronan McGinley — Nicholas Briggs
Irving Braxiatel — Miles Richardson
Joseph — Steven Wickham
Peter Summerfield — Thomas Grant
Parasiel — Paul Bryant
Commander Hallan — Michael Cuckson
Babs — Katarina Olsson
Jack — Toby Longworth
Thesanius — Gary Russell
Cassus — Joseph Lidster

Trivia
This story features a return to the Garazone Bazaar, first heard in the Doctor Who audio adventure Sword of Orion.

It's suggested that the Pandora creature is still trapped inside Irving Braxiatel's head which may explain his behaviour.

The story features the culmination of events leading back to The Mirror Effect.

It's implied that the Crystal of Cantus is actually from the Coronet of Rassilon.

External links
Big Finish Productions - Professor Bernice Summerfield: The Crystal of Cantus

Bernice Summerfield audio plays
Cybermen audio plays
Fiction set in the 27th century